The North American NAC-60 was the first American supersonic transport (SST) project. The development took place in the 1960s as part of a government-funded design competition to build an American SST as the joint Anglo-French Concorde and the short-serviced Soviet Tupolev Tu-144 were underway. The design, however, due to being slower and smaller than the expectations of the American SST Race, was rejected in favor of the Lockheed and Boeing designs, allowing them to get further study.

Design
In some respects, the NAC-60 was a scaled-up variant of North American's bomber prototype, the B-70 Valkyrie. As with the B-70, the design of the NAC-60 did not include horizontal stabilizers at the tail structure, but did include a set of canards at the nose, to improve directional stability at lower speeds. (The Concorde with which it was intended to compete had a wing designed for both subsonic and supersonic flight and, as a result, did not need canards.) And instead of twin rudders like on the B-70, there was just one rudder. This SST also had a less tapered fuselage and a more compound wing than the B-70's.

Specifications (North American NAC-60)

References

Abandoned civil aircraft projects of the United States
NAC-60
Supersonic transports
Tailless delta-wing aircraft
Quadjets